Jean Kaltak (born 19 August 1994) is a Vanuatuan international footballer who plays as forward for Vanuatuan club Ifira Black Bird and the Vanuatu national team.

Club career
Kaltak, formerly a youth player with the Teouma Academy, also started his senior career with the team, as they were elected to play in the Vanuatu Premia Divisen starting in the 2009–10 season. He played for them until 2011 before signing for Papua New Guinean side, Hekari United in September 2011.

International career
Kaltak initially played with Vanuatu's U-17 squad at the 2009 OFC U-17 Championship where Vanuatu finished fourth out of four teams. He continued with the team at the 2011 edition, scoring five goals as they again finished fourth.  Three months later, he debuted with Vanuatu's U-20 squad at the 2011 OFC U-20 Championship where he received the Golden Boot with six goals as Vanuatu finished third. His performances for the youth teams eventually got him a call-up into Vanuatu's senior team for a pair of friendly matches against the Solomon Islands towards the end of July 2011. He featured in both matches as a starter as they drew one and won one. He also scored 16 goals in 2015 Pacific Games against Federated States of Micronesia national under-23 football team.

Personal life
Kaltak's brothers, Tony and Kalfter, and cousin Brian are also footballers. His father, Ivoky, is a former Vanuatu international footballer who also played as a striker.

References

External links

1994 births
Living people
Vanuatuan footballers
Vanuatuan expatriate footballers
Vanuatu international footballers
Hekari United players
Tafea F.C. players
Erakor Golden Star F.C. players
2012 OFC Nations Cup players
2016 OFC Nations Cup players
Expatriate footballers in Papua New Guinea
Vanuatuan expatriate sportspeople in Papua New Guinea
Association football forwards
Vanuatu youth international footballers
Vanuatu under-20 international footballers